The Endometriosis Foundation of America, Inc. (EndoFound, EFA) is a non-profit organization dedicated to advancing awareness, promoting education and sponsoring research of endometriosis. EndoFound’s fourteen-member board of directors, as of 2020, includes patients, scientists, and physicians. It has a staff of eight as of 2020, and reported $1,359,233 revenues and $759,941 expenses in 2018. The society has its headquarters in New York, NY.

History and activities

The Endometriosis Foundation of America was founded in 2009 by Tamer Seckin and Padma Lakshmi. The Foundation promotes patient advocacy,  education for the medical community and the public, awareness of endometriosis, surgical training, and research. It sponsors yearly conferences for patients, their friends, and physicians on advancing the science and surgery of endometriosis. Its New York City high school, public awareness programs educate school nurses, students, and teachers about endometriosis.

EndoFound sponsors an annual scientific and surgical symposium for patients, scientists, and physicians and the Blossom Ball. Videos from the scientific and surgical symposium as well as publications are online. The Blossom Ball includes women who had endometriosis such as Susan Sarandon, Padma Lakshmi, Whoopi Goldberg,  Halsey, and Lena Dunham. 

The annual Harry Reich Awards are presented at the Blossom Ball and go to physicians and scientists for medical practice, research, and patient advocacy. The award is named for Harry Reich, a gynecologic  laparoscopist, who performed many firsts in surgery.

References

Further reading

External links
 EndoFound Home page

Medical associations based in the United States
Obstetrics and gynaecology organizations
Endometriosis